Clepsis plumbeolana is a species of moth of the family Tortricidae. It is found in Russia (Primorye, Amur), China (Heilongjiang) and North Korea.

References

Moths described in 1865
Clepsis